The Dubăsari Dam (also HPP Dubasari) is a hydroelectric dam at the Dniester river near Dubăsari in Transnistria, Moldova. It was built in 1951–1954.  The installed capacity of the hydroelectric power station is 48 MW.

The Dubăsari Dam creates the Dubăsari reservoir.

See also

 Dniester Hydroelectric Station – located upstream

References

Hydroelectric power stations in Moldova
Hydroelectric power stations built in the Soviet Union
Dams in Moldova
Dams completed in 1954
Energy infrastructure completed in 1954
Embankment dams
Dams on the Dniester